Giuseppe Bertoloni (16 September 1804, in Sarzana – 19 December 1874, in Bologna) was an Italian botanist and entomologist.

He was professor of botany in the University of Bologna which conserves his collections in the University Museum. Bertoloni worked especially on the flora and fauna of Mozambique. He was a member of La Società Entomologica Italiana.

His father Antonio (1775-1869) was a physician and botanist in Bologna.

Publications 
Partial list

Illustrazione dei prodotti naturali del Mozambico. Academia delle scienze dell'instituto de Bologna. Dissertazione 4: 343-363 (1852)
 Coleoptera nova Mozambicana. Rendiconto delle sezione delle R. Academia delle scienze dell'instituto di Bologna 1855: 51-53 (1855)
 Illustratio rerum naturalium Mozambici. Coleoptera. Dissertatio 5. Memorie delle Academie delle scienze dell'instituto di Bologna. Memorie della sezione delle scienze naturali 1855 (1855)

He also published extensively in the Bolognese journal Nuovi annali delle scienze naturali (1834-1854).

References 

Anon Boll. Soc. ent. ital. 2 :210-213, bibliography
Sforza G, G.storico Lunigiana 3:128-144, bibliography

External links 
DEI Zalf Bio and Portrait

Italian entomologists
1804 births
1874 deaths